Ptecticus is an Old World genus of flies in the family Stratiomyidae. The ground colour of the body may be yellow, brown or black, and the abdomen often shows a degree of transverse stripes. They may mimic parasitic wasps in appearance and habits. The wings are often dusky and the second abdominal segment may be translucent. A well-developed inner projection of the second antennal segment is characteristic for the majority of Ptecticus species. Their larvae are broad, flat and segmented maggots, which may be found in fermenting fruit. As of 2000, 40 species were known from the Old World alone. There are at least 150 described species in Ptecticus worldwide.

See also
 List of Ptecticus species

References

Stratiomyidae
Brachycera genera
Taxa named by Hermann Loew
Diptera of North America
Diptera of South America
Diptera of Asia
Diptera of Africa
Diptera of Australasia